Stamatović is a Serbian surname, derived from the male given name Stamat, itself derived from Greek name Stamatis meaning "stopper" (stamata means "to stop"). It may refer to:

Stanoje Glavaš (1763–1815), Serbian revolutionary
Aleksandar Stamatović (born 1967), Montenegrin historian
Uroš Stamatović (born 1976), retired Serbian footballer
Aleksandar Stamatović (born 1974),
Opera Singer

See also
Stamatopoulos, Greek surname
Stamatov, Bulgarian surname

Serbian surnames